There Will Come a Day is a 2013 Italian drama film directed by Giorgio Diritti. It premiered at the 2013 Sundance Film Festival. For her performance Jasmine Trinca won the Nastro d'Argento for Best Actress.

Cast 
 Jasmine Trinca: Augusta
 Anne Alvaro: Anna
 Pia Engleberth: Suor Franca
 Sonia Gessner: Antonia
 Amanda Fonseca Galvao: Janaina
 Paulo De Souza: Joao
 Eder Frota Dos Santos: Nilson

References

External links

2013 films
Italian drama films
2013 drama films
2010s Italian films